Giovanni Pettenella (28 March 1943 – 19 February 2010) was an Italian track cyclist. At the 1964 Summer Olympics he won a gold medal in the sprint and a silver in the 1000 m time trial. In the semi-final of the 1,000 metres sprint Pettenella and Pierre Trentin set an Olympic record for standing still - 21 minutes and 57 seconds. After that he turned professional and competed until 1975. In 1968 he won a bronze medal in the sprint at the world championships.

He died in Milan, Italy, and is buried at the city's Monumental Cemetery.

References

1943 births
2010 deaths
Italian male cyclists
Olympic gold medalists for Italy
Olympic silver medalists for Italy
Cyclists at the 1964 Summer Olympics
Olympic cyclists of Italy
Italian track cyclists
Cyclists from the Province of Verona
Olympic medalists in cycling
Medalists at the 1964 Summer Olympics
20th-century Italian people